Marko Vukićević (born 27 October 1992 in Ljubljana, Slovenia) is an alpine skier competing for Serbia. He competed for Serbia at the 2014 Winter Olympics in the alpine skiing events. He originally represented Slovenia but switched to compete for Serbia in 2012 since he is of Serbian origin.

References

1992 births
Living people
Olympic alpine skiers of Serbia
Alpine skiers at the 2014 Winter Olympics
Alpine skiers at the 2018 Winter Olympics
Alpine skiers at the 2022 Winter Olympics
Serbian male alpine skiers
Slovenian male alpine skiers
Slovenian people of Serbian descent
Skiers from Ljubljana
Competitors at the 2017 Winter Universiade